The Franciscan Complex or Franciscan Assemblage is a geologic term for a late Mesozoic terrane of heterogeneous rocks found throughout the California Coast Ranges, and particularly on the San Francisco Peninsula. It was named by geologist Andrew Lawson, who also named the San Andreas fault that defines the western extent of the assemblage.

The Franciscan Complex is dominated by greywacke sandstones, shales and conglomerates which have experienced low-grade metamorphism.  Other important lithologies include chert, basalt, limestone, serpentinite, and high-pressure, low-temperature metabasites (blueschists and eclogites) and meta-limestones. Fossils like radiolaria are found in chert beds of the Franciscan Complex. These fossils have been used to provide age constraints on the different terranes that constitute the Franciscan. The mining opportunities within the Franciscan are restricted to deposits of cinnabar and limestone.

The outcrops of the formation have a very large range, extending from Douglas County, Oregon to Santa Barbara County, California. Franciscan-like formations may be as far south as Santa Catalina Island. The formation lends its name to the term describing high-pressure regional metamorphic facies, the Franciscan facies series.

Geologic history

The Franciscan Complex is an assemblage of metamorphosed and deformed rocks, associated with east-dipping subduction zone at the western coast of North America. Although most of the Franciscan is Early/Late Jurassic through Cretaceous in age (150-66 Ma), some Franciscan rocks are as old as early Jurassic (180-190 Ma) age and as young as Miocene (15 Ma). The different age distribution represents the temporal and spatial variation of mechanisms that operated within the subduction zone. Franciscan rocks are thought to have formed prior to the creation of the San Andreas Fault when an ancient deep-sea trench existed along the California continental margin. This trench, the remnants of which are still active in the Cascadia and Cocos subduction zone, resulted from subduction of oceanic crust of the Farallon tectonic plate beneath continental crust of the North American Plate. As oceanic crust descended beneath the continent, ocean floor basalt and sediments were subducted and then tectonically underplated to the upper plate. This resulted in widespread deformation with the generation of thrust faults and folding, and caused high pressure-low temperature regional metamorphism. In the Miocene, the Farallon-Pacific spreading center reached the Franciscan trench and the relative motion between Pacific-North America caused the initiation of the San Andreas Fault. Transform motion along the San Andreas Fault obscured and displaced the subduction related structures, resulting in overprinting of two generations of structures.

Description

The units of the Franciscan complex are aligned parallel to the active margin between the North American and Pacific plates. The Franciscan Complex is in contact with the Great Valley Sequence, which was deposited on the Coast Range Ophiolite, along its eastern side. The type area of Franciscan rocks in San Francisco consists of metagraywackes, gray claystone and shale, thin bedded ribbon chert with abundant radiolarians, altered submarine pillow basalts (greenstone) and blueschists. Broadly, the Franciscan can be divided into two groups of rocks. Coherent terranes are internally consistent in metamorphic grade and include folded and faulted clastic sediments, cherts and basalts, ranging from sub-metamorphic to prehnite-pumpellyite or low-temperature blueschist (jadeite-bearing) grades of metamorphism. Mélange terranes are much smaller, found between or within the larger coherent terranes and sometimes contain large blocks of metabasic rocks of higher metamorphic grade (amphibolite, eclogite, and garnet-blueschist). The mélange zones in the Franciscan usually have a block in matrix appearance with higher grade metamorphic blocks (blueschist, amphibolite, greenschist, eclogite) embedded within the mélange matrix. The matrix material of the mélanges are mudstone or serpentinite. Geologists have argued for either a tectonic or olistostormal origin. In the northern Coast Ranges, the Franciscan has been divided into the Eastern, Central and Coastal Belts based on metamorphic age and grade, with the rocks younging and the metamorphic grade decreasing to the west. The Franciscan varies along strike, because individual accreted elements (packets of trench sediment, seamounts, etc.) did not extend the full length of the trench. Different depths of underplating, distribution of post-metamorphic faulting, and level of erosion produced the present-day surface distribution of high P/T metamorphism.

Gallery

Fossils
Franciscan sediments contain a sparse, but diverse assemblage of fossils. The most abundant fossils by far are microfossils, particularly in the cherts, which contain single-celled organisms called radiolarians that have exoskeletons of silica. There are also in some of the shales microfossils of planktonic foraminifera that have exoskeletons of carbonate. These microfossils, by and large, indicate deposition in an open-water setting where deep-water conditions exist. Vertebrate fossils in the Franciscan are extremely rare, but include three Mesozoic marine reptiles that are shown in the table below. Again, these indicate an open-water, and therefore deep-marine setting. Although rare, a few shallow-marine fossils have been found as well, and include extinct oysters (Inoceramus) and clams (Buchia). Microfossils in the Calera Limestone member of the Franciscan exposed at the Permanente and Pacifica cement quarries also indicate a shallow-marine setting, with deposition on top of a seamount in the tropical Pacific Ocean and subsequent transport and accretion by the Pacific Plate onto the California continental margin. Thus, even though most of the Franciscan appears to have been deposited in a deep-water setting, it is a complex and diverse assemblage of rocks, and shallow-water settings, though not the norm, existed as well.

Economic importance
Although no significant accumulations of oil or gas have been found in the Franciscan, other opportunities have been exploited over the years. During the 19th century when gold mining was one of the main industries in California, cinnabar associated with serpentine in the Franciscan and Great Valley Group was mined for quicksilver (mercury) needed to process gold ore and gold-bearing gravels. Some of the more important mines were those at New Idria and New Almaden, the Sulphur Bank Mine at Clearlake Oaks, and the Knoxville Mine (cf. McLaughlin Mine) and others at Knoxville. The Franciscan also contains large bodies of limestone pure enough for making cement, and the Permanente Quarry near Cupertino, California is a giant open-pit mine in a body of Franciscan limestone that supplied most of the cement for building the Shasta Dam across the Sacramento River. The Rockaway Beach Quarry at Pacifica is another example of a major limestone quarry in the Franciscan.

See also
 
 
 
 
Accretionary prism

Notes

References
 
Berkland, J. O., Raymond, L. A., Kramer, J. C., Moores, E. M., & O'Day, M. (1972). "What is Franciscan?". AAPG Bulletin, 56(12), pp. 2295a-2302. 

 

 Hamilton, W. (1969). "Mesozoic California and the underflow of Pacific mantle". Geological Society of America Bulletin, 80(12), pp. 2409-2430.

External links
 San Andreas Discussion - Tectonic Wedging
 Geology of the Golden Gate Headlands - National Park Service
Geology of San Francisco and Vicinity
 The Geology of the Franciscan Complex in the Ward-Creek-Cazadero Area, Sonoma County, California by Rolfe C. Erickson

Terranes
Cretaceous California
Jurassic California
Upper Jurassic Series
Geologic formations of California
Geology of Monterey County, California
Geology of San Francisco
Geology of San Luis Obispo County, California
Geology of San Mateo County, California
Geology of Santa Barbara County, California
Geology of Ventura County, California
Metamorphic complexes
Natural history of the California Coast Ranges
Petrology
Structural geology
Geology of Marin County, California